Pasquale Massacra (February 23, 1819 – March 16, 1849) was an Italian painter.

He was born and died in Pavia. Born to indigent parents, he was educated by professor Ferreri in Pavia.  He became involved in the patriotic revolutionary insurrections of 1848. He was killed during a night time raid. His main works include canvases depicting the Mother of Riccardino Langosco tracks the Body of her son, Frate Bussolari, and Filippone il Sicario.

References

1819 births
1849 deaths
Artists from Pavia
19th-century Italian painters
Italian male painters
19th-century Italian male artists